Family First may refer to:

Family First (film), also known as Chien de garde, a 2018 Canadian crime film
Family First Party, a historical Australian political party
Family First Party (2021), another Australian political party unrelated to the former party of the same name
Family First New Zealand, a New Zealand lobby group
Families First, a charity organization in the United States
Families First, a name used in some parts of the UK for the Troubled Families programme
Family First, a former name of the Nebraska Family Alliance
Family First Incorporation, (often abbreviated as F1i) is an American record label and film production company founded by Devarus "LookImHD" McKinney in March 2017.